Floris Isola (born 31 October 1991) is a French footballer who plays for RCO Agde as a defensive midfielder.

Career

Early career
Isola was born in Sète, Hérault. He started his career 2001 with Montpellier HSC, and played his senior debut in the Championnat de France amateur for the Reserve team (Montpelllier B) against ASF Andrézieux on  31 January 2009. He played three games for Montpellier Herault B, before joining league rivals FC Martigues.

MFK Košice
He made his debut for Košice against Nitra on 9 April 2011.

Sète
Isola was without a side for six months and returned to his native country to sign with his hometown club, FC Sète 34. He went on to make more than 150 league appearances for the club.

Agde
In the summer of 2020, after several seasons with Sète, Isola signed for RCO Agde.

References

External links
 
 

1991 births
Living people
People from Sète
Sportspeople from Hérault
French footballers
Association football midfielders
Montpellier HSC players
FC Martigues players
Championnat National 2 players
FC VSS Košice players
FC Sète 34 players
RCO Agde players
Championnat National 3 players
Slovak Super Liga players
French expatriate sportspeople in Slovakia
Expatriate footballers in Slovakia
Footballers from Occitania (administrative region)